Rio Grande da Serra is a train station on CPTM Line 10-Turquoise, located in the city of Rio Grande da Serra. Since 2002, is the terminus station of Line 10.

History

The station was opened as Rio Grande, built with wattle and daub and not tiled platform. Desert location at the time, was an intermediary station of water fueling for steam locomotives and train crossings. It was the second train station built in the state of São Paulo.

Rio Grande da Serra became a city in 1964, with the current name. Its station is still the same since the beginning of the century, well conserved. It works attending CPTM commuter trains, being the end of the line, as the track to Paranapiacaba don't receive trains anymore since 2002.

Railroad Ring
The project of the Railway Outline of São Paulo Metropolitan Region considers Evangelista de Souza station as start point of the South Railroad Ring. The track will connect Ouro Fino Paulista, in Ribeiro Pires, to the Evangelista de Souza station, in Parelheiros, allowing the cargo trains cross the São Paulo Metropolitan Region, without interfering in the commuter transportation of CPTM.

References

Companhia Paulista de Trens Metropolitanos stations
Railway stations opened in 1867